The Ho Chi Minh City Wings are a Vietnamese professional basketball team based in Ho Chi Minh City, Vietnam. They play in the Vietnam Basketball Association.

History
During the offseason after their inaugural seam, the Wings announced that Finnish head coach Mika Turunen would not return for their sophomore season and named former Vietnam national basketball team head coach Rick Magallanes as his replacement.

Season-by-season record

Current roster

References

Basketball teams established in 2016
Basketball teams in Vietnam
Vietnam Basketball Association teams